John Ryan (3 November 1784 in Borris – 4 June 1864 in Limerick) was an Irish Roman Catholic bishop.

Ryan was educated at St Patrick's College, Maynooth and ordained a priest in 1810. He was consecrated Bishop of Limerick on 17 March 1828 and died in post.

References

1784 births
People from County Tipperary
Alumni of St Patrick's College, Maynooth
1864 deaths
19th-century Roman Catholic bishops in Ireland
Roman Catholic bishops of Limerick